Utrecht Hill Ridge is a ridge of low sandhills that stretches in a direction from southeast to northwest over the Dutch province of Utrecht and over a part of North Holland. The total length of the region is about 50 km. It covers an area of approximately 23,000 hectares. The part of the ridge in North Holland is commonly called Het Gooi in Dutch, the Gooi (area) in English.

On the southeastern side the ridge rises sharply from the valley of the Nederrijn (“Lower Rhine”). Here the famous Grebbeberg (“Grebbe Mountain”) forms a landmark (52 m. high) where Battle of the Grebbeberg took place in 1940 as important part of Battle of the Netherlands. The highest peak of the ridge is the Amerongse Berg (“Amerongen Mountain”) of 68 m. On the northern side the ridge continues to the shores of the Gooimeer (“Lake Gooi”).

The Utrecht Hill Ridge was created 150.000 years ago as a push moraine in the Wolstonian Stage, a middle Pleistocene glacial period. Before that time the rivers Rhine and Meuse flowed more north, and created deposits of sand. The glaciers pushed these deposits in a southern and western direction.

After the last Ice Age the area got overgrown with woods. In historical times the population increased and woodlands were cleared for cattle and sheep. The Utrecht Hill Ridge was then largely covered with heather and sand drifts. In the 19th and 20th century large parts of the ridge were replanted with trees again.

The Utrecht Hill Ridge has given name to:
 Utrechtse Heuvelrug, a municipality in the southern part of the ridge, that was formed 1 January 2006 as a combination of the former municipalities of Amerongen, Doorn, Driebergen-Rijsenburg, Leersum, and Maarn.
 Utrechtse Heuvelrug National Park, a national park in the southern part of the region, that was established 11 October 2003. It covers 6,000 hectares.

External links
 

Ridges of Europe
Regions of the Netherlands
Regions of North Holland
Regions of Utrecht (province)
Landforms of North Holland
Landforms of Utrecht (province)